The Historic Formula One Championship, previously known as the Thoroughbred Grand Prix Championship, was a championship for Formula One cars from the 1960s, 1970s and 1980s which is sanctioned by the Fédération Internationale de l'Automobile. The motor sport's world governing body. The championship was recognised by the FIA in 1994 as the only official FIA Historic Formula One Championship and its first season was in 1995. For 2013, the series was absorbed by Masters Racing to create the FIA Masters Historic Formula One Championship.

Regulations

Class system
The championship is split into four classes according to the vehicle's age and technical specification.

The HFO Competition features classic Grand Prix racing cars from the 20-year period between 1966 and 1985. During that period, there were design innovations and regulatory changes which resulted in significant performance differences and there is a vast speed differential between the earlier cars such as Tyrrell 001 and the later machines like the Tyrrell 012 and Brabham BT49.
 
To level the playing field, the championship is split into four classes according to age and design characteristics of the car. Drivers score points within their particular car's class and all have the chance to claim the overall FIA trophy at the end of the season.

Points 
Effectively, there are four competitions going on within every race and each provides points for the driver based on his or her placing in the car's class and the number of competing cars in that class.

An additional point will be awarded to the drivers who achieve the fastest lap in each class during the race.

Championship awards 
The Champion is the driver who scores the greatest points total, regardless of the class in which he or she competes and it is possible for a driver to switch classes during the season. In addition to overall champion, awards also go to drivers with the highest total of points in each class excluding the overall champion, as follows: 

Historic Formula One Historic Cup – The competitor scoring the highest number of points in Class A.

Historic Formula One Classic Cup – The competitor scoring the highest number of points in Class B.

Historic Formula One Cup – The competitor scoring the highest number of points in Class C.

Historic Formula One Sporting Cup – The competitor scoring the highest number of points in Class D.

These are all FIA awards which are presented at an official FIA Historic Awards event.

Additional awards 
HFO also presents its own awards at a slightly less formal and usually much more boisterous event as follows:

The Chairman's Trophy – Introduced in 2009 Tony Smith, this is awarded to the competitor who, in the chairman's opinion, best exhibits the "Spirit of the Championship".

The Geoff Richardson Trophy – Provided by an engine builder, the trophy is awarded to the best newcomer.

The Nicholson McLaren Trophy – Provided by another engine builder. This 'trophy' is awarded to the 'best' team.

The Ensign Trophy – Provided by the former CEO of HFO, Mike Wheatley, who is something of an Ensign fan, having 'raced' an example in HFO very successfully. Although never a winner, the marque was at its peak during the class B period and this trophy goes to the winner of Class B.

The Colin Chapman Trophy – provided by Clive Chapman and Classic Team Lotus. It is hard to imagine any historic category without a Colin Chapman Trophy but, as in HFO's case, it is equally hard to determine which period it might be applied to since Chapman was responsible for so many 'innovations'.

After considering that Class C covers the period when ground effects, carbon fibre chassis and the controversial twin chassis Lotus Type 88 all emerged from Chapman's expertise, it was agreed that this trophy would go to the winner of Class C.

Champions

References

External links
 Thoroughbred Grand Prix Cars - Historic Formula One
 Historic Formula One 2010 Championship Review

 
1995 establishments in Europe
2012 disestablishments in Europe
Formula racing series
Formula One
Historic motorsport events